Video Capture Device (full title Weezer – Video Capture Device: Treasures from the Vault 1991–2002) is a DVD released by rock band Weezer. It contains footage from various live gigs in the band's history, from the early stages of their musical career until 2002. The DVD also contains all of the Weezer music videos from The Blue Album until Maladroit. Bonus footage features the band backstage, on-stage, in the recording studio and in interviews.

Easter Egg
Highlighting "Maladroit" on the TV Promos section and pressing right will make a large =w= symbol appear. Click on it to see the bonus feature "Wig Fishin" featuring Weezer frontman Rivers Cuomo wearing a long blonde wig during an appearance on British television program Popworld. The European edition of the DVD is lacking this bonus feature.

Sales
The DVD debuted at #1 on Billboard's Top Music Video charts and has sold 78,968 copies as of October 2005, thus making it certified as a Gold selling DVD.

Notes

External links 
 

Weezer video albums
2000s English-language films
2004 video albums